Rob Harris is a British sports journalist who is a global sports writer for the Associated Press. He has appeared on MSNBC, BBC and Sky News.

Career 
Harris has worked for the Associated Press as a global sports writer. In 2015, while covering the FIFA arrests in Zurich, Harris captured the only video of former FIFA officials being taken into custody by law enforcement at the Baur au Lac Hotel. He has often appeared as an analyst on Sky News, BBC News, CBC News, Al-Jazeera, Al-Arabiya and APTN.

References

External links 
 

Living people
Year of birth missing (living people)
People educated at Manchester Grammar School
Alumni of the University of York
Associated Press people
The Guardian people
21st-century British journalists
21st-century British writers
British sportswriters
British sports journalists
British newspaper people
Sky News newsreaders and journalists